The Texas Tech Red Raiders college football team represents Texas Tech University in the National Collegiate Athletic Association (NCAA) Division I Football Bowl Subdivision as a member of the Big 12 Conference's South Division. Texas Tech players and coaches of exceptional ability have received various accolades.

All-Americans
Each year, numerous publications and organizations release lists of All-America teams, hypothetical rosters of players considered the best in the nation at their respective positions. Some selecting organizations choose more than one roster of All-Americans, in which case they use the terms "first team", "second team", and "third team" as appropriate. College Sports Information Directors of America awards similar All-American honors with a focus on academic achievements.

The National Collegiate Athletic Association, a college sports governing body, uses officially recognized All-America selectors to determine the "consensus" selections. These are based on a point system in which a player is awarded three points for every selector that names him to the first team, two points for the second team, and one point for the third team. The individual who receives the most points at his position is called a consensus All-American. Over time, the sources used to determine the consensus selections have changed, and since 2002, the NCAA has used five selectors, the Associated Press (AP), American Football Coaches Association (AFCA), Football Writers Association of America (FWAA), The Sporting News (TSN), and the Walter Camp Football Foundation (WCFF), to determine consensus All-Americans.

In 1935, end Herschel Ramsey was the first Texas Tech player to be named an All-American. Twenty-five years later in 1960, linebacker E. J. Holub became Texas Tech's first consensus All-American. Texas Tech players have earned consensus All-America honors 12 times: E. J. Holub in 1960, Donny Anderson in 1965, Dan Irons in 1977, Gabriel Rivera in 1982, Mark Bounds in 1991, Zach Thomas in 1995, Byron Hanspard in 1996, Montae Reagor in 1998, Michael Crabtree in 2007 and 2008, Brandon Carter in 2008, and Jace Amaro in 2013.

First team

Second team

Third team

Academic

All-conference honorees

Border Intercollegiate Athletic Association

|}

Southwest Conference

Big 12 Conference

First Team

Second Team

College Football Hall of Fame inductees

Seven Red Raider players, Donny Anderson, Hub Bechtol, E. J. Holub, Byron Hanspard, Dave Parks, Gabriel Rivera, and Zach Thomas, have been inducted into the College Football Hall of Fame.

Retired jerseys

Three Red Raider football players have had their jersey numbers retired. E.J. Holub's No. 55 was retired on Dec. 19, 1960, and Donny Anderson's No. 44 was retired Nov. 11, 1995. Dave Parks's No. 81 jersey was retired Nov. 17, 2001. Both Holub and Anderson are members of the College Football Hall of Fame.

Trophies and awards

AT&T ESPN All-America Player of the Year
Michael Crabtree (2007)
Graham Harrell (2008)
CBSSports.com Freshman of the Year
Michael Crabtree (2007)
Doak Walker Award
Bam Morris (1993)
Byron Hanspard (1996)
Fred Biletnikoff Award
Michael Crabtree (2007, 2008)
Johnny Unitas Golden Arm Award
Graham Harrell (2008)
Mosi Tatupu Award
Wes Welker (2003)
Paul Warfield Trophy
Michael Crabtree (2007, 2008)
Sammy Baugh Trophy
Kliff Kingsbury (2002)
B. J. Symons (2003)
Graham Harrell (2007)
Patrick Mahomes (2016)
Sporting News College Football Player of the Year
Donny Anderson (1965)
Graham Harrell (2008)
Touchdown Club of Columbus' Freshman of the Year
Michael Crabtree (2007)

Big 12 Conference Defensive Player of the Year
Dwayne Slay (2005)
Big 12 Conference Defensive Newcomer of the Year
McKinner Dixon (2008)
Big 12 Conference Offensive Freshman of the Year
Shaud Williams (1999)
Michael Crabtree (2007)
Baker Mayfield (2013)
Big 12 Conference Offensive Newcomer of the Year
Robert Johnson (2005)
Southwest Conference Defensive Player of the Year
Gabriel Rivera (1982)

Texas Tech Ring of Honor
Texas Tech announced the creation of the Football Ring of Honor in June 2012. The Ring of Honor consists of an "elite group of players and coaches that made outstanding contributions to Red Raider Football." Each player in the ring of honor has his name permanently added to the interior of the stadium on the West building.

Ring of Honor Members

References

Texas Tech Red Raiders football
Texas Tech Red Raiders
Red Raiders
Texas Tech Red Raiders football honorees